Per Anders Wilgotson (born 30 September 1950) is a Swedish rower. He competed at the 1980 Summer Olympics and the 1984 Summer Olympics.

References

External links
 
 
 

1950 births
Living people
Swedish male rowers
Olympic rowers of Sweden
Rowers at the 1980 Summer Olympics
Rowers at the 1984 Summer Olympics
Place of birth missing (living people)